Steven Logan Bennett (April 22, 1946 – June 29, 1972) was a United States Air Force pilot who posthumously received the Medal of Honor for heroism during the Vietnam War on August 8, 1974.

Honors
He is the namesake of the ship  and his name is engraved on the Vietnam Memorial at Panel 01W - Row 051.  There have been numerous other dedications held in his honor.  They range from streets being named after him to buildings, including a gymnasium and a cafeteria, a sports arena and VFW posts, and many monuments.  He has been mentioned in several military history books. Captain Bennett has a public park named in his honor in Palestine,Texas.

Medal of Honor citation
The President of the United States takes pride in presenting the MEDAL OF HONOR
posthumously to
CAPTAIN STEVEN L. BENNETT
UNITED STATES AIR FORCE
20th Tactical Air Support Squadron, Pacific Air Forces.
Place and date of action: Quang Tri, Republic of Vietnam, June 29, 1972.
For service as set forth in the following

Citation:

Capt. Bennett was the pilot of a light aircraft flying an artillery adjustment mission along a heavily defended segment of route structure. A large concentration of enemy troops was massing for an attack on a friendly unit. Capt. Bennett requested tactical air support but was advised that none was available. He also requested artillery support but this too was denied due to the close proximity of friendly troops to the target. Capt. Bennett was determined to aid the endangered unit and elected to strafe the hostile positions. After 4 such passes, the enemy force began to retreat. Capt. Bennett continued the attack, but, as he completed his fifth strafing pass, his aircraft was struck by a surface-to-air missile, which severely damaged the left engine and the left main landing gear. As fire spread in the left engine, Capt. Bennett realized that recovery at a friendly airfield was impossible. He instructed his observer to prepare for an ejection, but was informed by the observer that his parachute had been shredded by the force of the impacting missile. Although Capt. Bennett had a good parachute, he knew that if he ejected, the observer would have no chance of survival. With complete disregard for his own life, Capt. Bennett elected to ditch the aircraft into the Gulf of Tonkin, even though he realized that a pilot of this type aircraft had never survived a ditching. The ensuing impact upon the water caused the aircraft to cartwheel and severely damaged the front cockpit, making escape for Capt. Bennett impossible. The observer successfully made his way out of the aircraft and was rescued. Capt. Bennett's unparalleled concern for his companion, extraordinary heroism and intrepidity above and beyond the call of duty, at the cost of his life, were in keeping with the highest traditions of the military service and reflect great credit upon himself and the U.S. Air Force.

(signed) GERALD R. FORD

Awards and decorations

Personal life

Bennett studied at the University of Southwestern Louisiana (USL) from 1964 to 1968, prior to commissioning into the US Air Force in 1968.  He then attended Pilot Training at Webb Air Force Base in Big Spring, Texas.  He and Linda Leveque married in September 1968.  The Bennetts had one child, Angela Bennett Engele, who lives in the Dallas–Fort Worth area and is the current president of the OV-10 Association located in Fort Worth and the Volunteer Administrator (a volunteer position) for the Fort Worth Aviation Museum.

See also

List of Medal of Honor recipients for the Vietnam War

References

 
 at msc.mil

External links

1946 births
1972 deaths
United States Air Force Medal of Honor recipients
United States Air Force officers
American military personnel killed in the Vietnam War
People from Palestine, Texas
Recipients of the Air Medal
University of Louisiana at Lafayette alumni
Vietnam War recipients of the Medal of Honor
Aviators killed by being shot down
Victims of aviation accidents or incidents in 1972
United States Air Force personnel of the Vietnam War
Military personnel from Texas